This is a list of original affiliates of the ESPN Plus-operated SEC TV, a syndicated sports programming package that was operated by ESPN Plus, a unit of ESPN, Inc., and was in operation from September 5, 2009 until the end of the 2013–2014 basketball season, before the cable and satellite-exclusive SEC Network was launched in August of that year. All stations listed here are stations that have broadcast at least one Southeastern Conference football and/or basketball game from the service.

Original affiliates

Regional sports networks and other platforms

References

External links
Southeastern Conference
2012 SEC Network Affiliates (ESPN Media Zone)

 
 

SEC former